Ji Wu from the National Space Science Center, Beijing, China was named Fellow of the Institute of Electrical and Electronics Engineers (IEEE) in 2015 for leadership in microwave remote sensing and its application to satellite programs.

References

External links
 IEEE Bio
 

Fellow Members of the IEEE
Living people
Year of birth missing (living people)
Place of birth missing (living people)